Barroso is a Portuguese and Spanish surname. Notable people with the surname include:

Abelardo Barroso (1905–1972), Cuban singer
Agustina Barroso (born 1993), Argentine footballer
Alexandre Barroso (born 1963), Brazilian football manager
Antonio Barroso y Sánchez-Guerra (1893–1982), Spanish general and politician
Ary Barroso (1903–1964), Brazilian composer
Eric Barroso (born 1990), Spanish footballer
Francimar Barroso (born 1980), Brazilian mixed martial artist
Francisco Manuel Barroso (1804–1882), 19th century Brazilian commodore
Gustavo Barroso (1888–1957), Brazilian writer and politician
Inezita Barroso (1925–2015), Brazilian folk singer
Ismael Barroso (born 1983), Venezuelan boxer
João Soares, full name João Barroso Soares (born 1949), Portuguese lawyer and politician
José Barroso (born 1970), Portuguese footballer
José Manuel Barroso (born 1956), former Prime Minister of Portugal and the former President of the European Commission
Julio Barroso (born 1985), Argentine footballer
Luís Oliveira, full name Luís Airton Barroso Oliveira (born 1969), Brazilian-Belgian footballer
Luís Roberto Barroso (born 1958), Brazilian jurist and judge of the Brazilian supreme court
Manuel Barroso (born 1964), Portuguese modern pentathlete
Maria Barroso (1925–2015), Portuguese actress and wife of former Portuguese Prime Minister Mário Soares
Mariano Barroso (born 1959), Spanish film director and screenwriter
Mário Barroso (born 1947), Portuguese film director, actor and cinematographer
Miguel Barroso (1538–1590), Spanish painter
Philippe Barroso (born 1955), French alpine skier
Ricardo Barroso Barroso (born 1973), Mexican architect and plastic artist
Ricardo Barroso Agramont (born 1980), Mexican politician
Tomás Barroso (born 1990), Portuguese basketball player

Portuguese-language surnames
Spanish-language surnames